is a Japanese footballer currently playing as a forward for YSCC Yokohama.

Career statistics

Club
.

Notes

References

External links

1997 births
Living people
Japanese footballers
Danish men's footballers
Association football forwards
Keio University alumni
J3 League players
YSCC Yokohama players